Page Airport  is a public use airport located two nautical miles (3.7 km) south of the central business district of Walla Walla, a city in Walla Walla County, Washington, United States.

Facilities and aircraft 
It has one runway designated 9/27 with a turf surface measuring 2,000 by 25 feet (610 x 8 m).

References

External links 

Airports in Washington (state)
Transportation buildings and structures in Walla Walla County, Washington